The ABB ALP-44 was an electric locomotive which was built by Asea Brown Boveri of Sweden between 1989 and 1997 for the New Jersey Transit and SEPTA railway lines.

Service

New Jersey Transit
New Jersey Transit acquired 32 ALP-44s for use on its electric railway lines. The first fifteen, numbered 4400–4414 and designated ALP-44O (Original), were delivered in 1990 (prototypes 4400 and 4401 in late 1989). Five additional units, numbered 4415–4419 and designated ALP-44E (Extended), were delivered in 1995. The final 12 locomotives, numbered 4420–4431 and designated ALP-44M (Microprocessor), were delivered in 1996 for the new Midtown Direct service.

NJT's ALP-44s were to be overhauled for a cost of $2 million during a two-year period by Philadelphia-based Interfleet Technology. A car builder had not yet been selected to carry out the overhaul. However, by June 2009, NJT decided that it would be more efficient (economically and physically) to replace the ALP-44s rather than overhaul them, and exercised an option of 9 additional ALP-46A's to enable the replacement to take place.

By late 2011, all NJ Transit ALP-44 O, E, and M locomotives had been retired, having been replaced by the ALP-46 and ALP-46A locomotives. The exceptions were Nos. 4405, 4407 and 4409, which were assigned to the Atlantic City Express Service (ACES); however, these remaining units were also placed into retirement with the cancellation of ACES service in early 2012. Unit Nos. 4402, 4403, 4408 and 4410 were leased by Amtrak for work train service through the Hudson River tunnels for a period of time during summer 2011, but then were returned.

During 2012, the ALP-44s were prepared for storage in groups of five at a time. This work included the removal of pantographs and having the cab windows covered with steel plating. These units were then moved to Port Morris Yard and the Lackawanna Cut-Off stub track for storage in Stanhope, New Jersey, where they are now stored today.

SEPTA
SEPTA received a single ALP-44M unit, #2308, from ABB, which was part of a damages settlement for a lawsuit stemming from the late delivery of N5 cars for the Norristown High Speed Line. It was replaced, along with the AEM-7s, with the ACS-64 in October 2018, with a farewell trip on December 1, 2018.

After the farewell, 2308, as well as seven AEM-7's, were leased to NJ Transit to help alleviate a locomotive shortage due to positive train control installation on their locomotives. However, they were never used for New Jersey Transit and returned to SEPTA in May 2019. The AEM-7s and the ALP-44 were eventually reassigned to SEPTA work service until 2021. In February 2022, the AEM-7s and ALP-44 were withdrawn and sold off. As of late 2022, All AEM-7s and the ALP-44 have been scrapped.

Specifications
The ALP-44 was based on the Rc6 model and designed specifically for New Jersey Transit as a variant of the EMD AEM-7 electric locomotive, used by Amtrak (until June 2016), MARC (until April 2017), and SEPTA (until December 2018). ALP-44 stands for American Locomotive Passenger 4-Axle 4.32 MW. The ALP-44 is powered by overhead lines through one of the locomotive's two pantographs and can produce up to 7000 hp (5.2 MW) with a top speed of up to 125 mph (201 km/h). In commercial use, however, both New Jersey Transit and SEPTA ALP-44s are only cleared for speeds up to 100 mph (161 km/h).

ALP-44M
The ALP-44M is a variant of the original ALP-44 design. It includes a microprocessor control for functions such as braking and the then new EPIC brake control stand. These locomotives were notorious for their faulty software, which frequently caused problems and kept them out of service for maintenance.

Gallery

See also
EMD AEM-7 A similar locomotive used by Amtrak, MARC and Septa

References

External links

 New Jersey Transit
 SEPTA
 New Jersey Transit rail operations
 Unofficial NJT locomotive roster

NJ Transit Rail Operations
SEPTA Regional Rail
11 kV AC locomotives
Passenger locomotives
Electric locomotives of the United States
Railway locomotives introduced in 1990
Standard gauge locomotives of the United States